The Gift of Time is an album by French jazz fusion artist Jean-Luc Ponty, released in 1987. It was his first recording for Columbia Records after twelve albums on the Atlantic label. It was reissued on CD in 1991.

Track listing 
All songs by Jean-Luc Ponty.
"Prologue" – 1:01
"New Resolutions" – 4:47
"Faith in You" – 4:46
"No More Doubts" – 4:47
"Between Sea and Sky" – 5:04
"Metamorphosis" – 5:51
"Introspective Perceptions" – 7:30
"The Gift of Time" – 5:05

Personnel 
 Jean-Luc Ponty – violin, Prophet-5 & Synclavier synthesizers, electronic percussion, effects
 Pat Thomi – electric guitar (tracks 2, 4-6)
 Baron Browne – electric bass (tracks 2-6, 8)
 Rayford Griffin – drums, percussion (tracks 2-6, 8)

Production notes
 Jean-Luc Ponty – producer
 David Hentschel – engineer, mixing
 Bernie Grundman – mastering
 Joe Gastwirt – remastering

Charts

References

External links 
 Jean-Luc Ponty The Gift of Time (1987) album review by Richard S. Ginell, credits & releases at AllMusic
 Jean-Luc Ponty The Gift of Time (1987) album releases & credits at Discogs
 Jean-Luc Ponty The Gift of Time (1987) album credits & user reviews at ProgArchives.com
 Jean-Luc Ponty The Gift of Time (1987) album to be listened as stream on Spotify

1987 albums
Jean-Luc Ponty albums
Columbia Records albums